A jjimjilbang is a large, sex-segregated public bathhouse in South Korea, furnished with hot tubs, showers, Korean traditional kiln saunas and massage tables. Jjimjil is derived from the words meaning heating. In other areas of the building or on other floors there are unisex areas, usually with a snack bar, ondol-heated floor for lounging and sleeping, wide-screen TVs, exercise rooms, ice rooms, heated salt rooms, PC bang, noraebang, and sleeping quarters with bunk beds or sleeping mats. Many of the sleeping rooms have themes or elements to them. Usually jjimjilbangs will have various rooms with temperatures to suit guests' preferred relaxing temperatures. The walls are decorated with woods, minerals, crystals, stones, and metals to make the ambient mood and smell more natural. The elements used have traditional Korean medicinal purposes in the rooms.

Most jjimjilbangs are open 24 hours and are a popular weekend getaway for South Korean families. During the week, many hardworking South Korean men, whose families live out of the city for cost savings, stay in jjimjilbangs overnight after working or drinking with co-workers late into the night. The cost is around 8,000–12,000 won to enter, and one can sleep overnight and enjoy the bathhouse and sauna.

Hanjeungmak
Hanjeungmak (Hangul: 한증막, Hanja: 汗蒸幕) is Korean traditional sauna. Intensely hot and dry, it uses traditionally burning wood of pine to heat a domelike kiln made of stone. Nowadays, hanjeungmaks are incorporated into jjimjilbang rather than being independent facilities. Bulgama installed in jjimjilbang is a variety of hanjeungmak, heated with higher temperature. Sometimes the dome-shaped walls of kiln rooms are plastered with loam, salt, minerals.

History
The first mention of hanjeungmak, initially referred to as Hanjeungso (Hanja: 汗蒸所), is found in the Annals of Sejong in the 15th century. The record also states that the Korean kiln saunas were used for medicinal purposes. At that time, hanjeungmaks were state-supported kiln saunas maintained by Buddhist monks. Since 1429, saunas have been built as separate facilities for men and women. There is a picture painted by Kim Jun geun in the 19th century depicting a hanjeungmak and its circular wall made from bricks accompanied by a bath house.

Facilities 
Jjimjilbangs usually operate 24 hours a day. In the entrance, there are the doors labelled “men” or “women” and shoes are to be stored using a given key. Once inside, the shoe locker key is exchanged with another locker key to store clothes and belongings. Afterwards bathers walk into the gender-segregated bathhouse area (children of both genders below seven years of age are free to intermingle) and take a shower. Then, one should wear the jjimjilbang clothes (usually a T-shirt and shorts, color-coordinated according to gender), which are received with the locker key.

In the bathing areas, there are kiln saunas with themes including a jade, a salt, or mineral kiln: the dome-shaped inside the kilns are plastered with jade powder, salt and mineral respectively.

The temperature of the kilns is displayed on a sign at the entrance.

In addition, it has various facilities such as PC room, sleeping room, arcade, movie room, fitness center, and karaoke. In the case of sleeping spaces, there are many places that are separated for men and women. There are usually cushions, blankets, towels, and pillows on the floor. Pillows are usually made of hard wood or soft leather, and cloth is rare.

Hygiene 
Jjimjilbangs are kept in a very sanitary condition for the health of patrons, and most are cleaned continuously. No harsh chemicals are used in the waters or saunas.

But there have been cases in some jimjilbangs where molds or athletes foot germs were detected during the hygiene inspection, and there were also cases of administrative sanctions due to expired food.
Currently, health control standards are set by the Public Health Control Act.

All wet areas prohibit the use of clothing for safety reasons. With the extreme heat of the baths and steam rooms, it is believed that toxic chemicals can leach out of apparel and into the body. It is also believed that if you wear a swimsuit or cover up you may be trying to hide a disease.

Recently, the hygienic quality and healthiness of some jjimjilbangs were questioned, especially the proper washing of clothing provided by the jjimjilbangs. Concerns about the clothes increasing atopy symptoms in patients, or even of accidentally hosting parasites, were voiced, although the evidence was inconclusive.

Theft
Theft, usually of smartphones, is occasionally a problem at some jimjilbangs.

Food

 Iced Sikhye is a sweet rice beverage. 
 Baked eggs are eggs slow-cooked in the hottest sauna. They are eaten like a hard-boiled egg.
 Miyeokguk is a soup made from miyeok, a type of seaweed; and typically a mussel based broth.
 Patbingsu is a shaved ice dessert with sweet toppings such as chopped fruit, condensed milk, fruit syrup, and Azuki beans.
 Iced coffee

See also
 Mogyoktang
 Sauna
 Banya
 Finnish sauna
 Sentō
 Spa
 Ttaemiri

References

Further reading
 Stein, Carol. THE SECRET LA REVISTA. Han-Jeung-Mak

External links

For All Kinds of Good, Clean Fun, Koreans Turn to Bathhouses (2008-10-04) New York Times article
Database of Korean Saunas at Saunascape.com
Seoul Zimzilbang Toronto at Seoul Zimzilbang Toronto
Jjim Jil Bang in Vietnam at Temple Leaf Spa Land

South Korean popular culture
Public baths